A & C Black is a British book publishing company, owned since 2002 by Bloomsbury Publishing. The company is noted for publishing Who's Who since 1849 and the Encyclopedia Britannica between 1827 and 1903. It offers a wide variety of books in fiction and nonfiction, and has published popular travel guides, novels, and science books.

History

The firm was founded in 1807 by Charles and Adam Black in Edinburgh. In 1851, the company purchased the copyrights to Sir Walter Scott's Waverly novels for £27,000. The company moved to the Soho district of London in 1889. 

During the years 1827–1903 the firm published the seventh, eighth and ninth editions of the Encyclopædia Britannica. This was purchased from Archibald Constable after his company's failure to publish the seventh edition of the encyclopedia. Adam Black retired in 1870 due to his disapproval of his sons' extravagant plans for its ninth edition. This edition, however, would sell half a million sets and was released in 24 volumes from 1875 to 1889. 

Beginning in 1839, the firm published a series of travel guides known as Black's Guides.

The company was the publisher of the annual Who's Who (since 1849) and also, since 2002, the Whitaker's Almanack. Other notable works include Black's Medical Dictionary and the Know The Game series of sports rules and laws reference books.

The firm also published the A. & C. Black Colour Books: Twenty Shilling Series (1901–21), a "range of high-quality colour collectable picture books" which are still collected by bibliophiles.

In 1902 they published P. G. Wodehouse's first book, The Pothunters, and went on to produce many of his early works.

In 1989 A & C Black purchased both Christopher Helm Publishers and later the Pica Press, publishers of the Helm Identification Guides, from Christopher Helm.

In 2000 A & C Black was purchased by Bloomsbury Publishing Plc, which continued producing the former's range of reference works.

In June 2002, T. & A. D. Poyser and their back-list of around 70 ornithology titles were acquired from Elsevier Science.

A & C Black purchased Methuen Drama from Methuen Publishing in 2006, and acquired Arden Shakespeare from Cengage Learning in 2008.

In 2016, A & C Black Music list moved to Collins Learning, a division of HarperCollins Publishers Ltd.

Notable books

Black's Medical Dictionary
Whitaker's Almanack
Who's Who
Wisden Cricketers' Almanack
Writers' & Artists' Yearbook

Book series
 Artist's Sketch Book Series
 Ballet Pocket Series (Newman Wolsey; then: A. & C. Black)
 Black's Guides
 Black's Junior Reference Books
 Black's Novel Library
 Black's Popular Series of Colour Books
 Black's School History
 Black's "Water-colour" series
 Colour Books: The 7s. 6d. Net Series
 Colour Books: The 6s. Net Series
 Colour Books: The 10s. Net Series
 Colour Books: The 20s. Net Series
 Dancers of To-day
 Ecclesiastical History of England (General Editor: J. C. Dickinson)
 The Fascination of London
 Guild Text-books
 How-and-Why Series
 Know the Game
 The Making of the Nations
 Peeps at Ancient Civilisations
 Peeps at Great Cities
 Peeps at Great Explorers
 Peeps at Great Men
 Peeps at Great Railways
 Peeps at History
 Peeps at Industries
 Peeps at Many Lands
 Peeps at Nature
 Peeps at Nature for Little Children
 Peeps for Little People
 The Peeps Series (sometimes called: Miscellaneous Peeps series)
 Social Life in England

Imprints
 Adlard Coles Nautical
 Arden Shakespeare
 Andrew Brodie Publications
 Featherstone
 Methuen Drama
 T. & A. D. Poyser
 Reeds Almanac
 John Wisden & Co

References

Further reading
 Colin Inman, The A & C Black Colour Books: A Collector's Guide and Bibliography 1900-1930, London: Werner Shaw, 1990.

External links

 A&C Black - archive.org copy of the site as it was on 15 January 2010.
 History of A&C Black, acblack.com (archive.org copy).
 Bloomsbury Publishing corporate structure
 Bloomsbury Publishing corporate history
 Whitaker's Almanack
 A & C Black Colour Books: Twenty Shilling Series
 Records of A. & C. Black Publishers Ltd, University of Reading
 Recovering Publishing Histories: the Adam & Charles Black Letterbooks

Encyclopædia Britannica
Ornithological publishing companies
Publishing companies established in 1807
1807 establishments in Scotland
1889 establishments in England
Companies based in Edinburgh
History of Edinburgh
Companies based in the City of Westminster
Book publishing companies of Scotland
2002 mergers and acquisitions